is an interchange passenger railway station in located in the city of Gobō, Wakayama Prefecture, Japan, operated by West Japan Railway Company (JR West) and the private railway company Kishū Railway.

Lines
It is also the terminus of the Kishū Railway Line and is 2.7 kilometers from the opposing terminus at

Station layout
The station consists of one side platform and one island platform serving three tracks. The side platform ahas a cutout to form a partial bay platform for the dead headed operations of the Kishū Railway Line. The station as a Midori no Madoguchi staffed ticket office.

Platforms

Adjacent stations

|-
!colspan=5|West Japan Railway Company (JR West)

|-
!colspan=5|Kishū Railway

History
Gobō Station opened on April 21, 1929. The Kishū Railway began operations on June 15, 1931. The current station building was completed in March 1984. With the privatization of the Japan National Railways (JNR) on April 1, 1987, the station came under the aegis of the West Japan Railway Company.

Passenger statistics
In fiscal 2019, the JR portion of the station was used by an average of 1575 passengers daily and the Kishū Railway portion was used by 141 passengers daily (boarding passengers only).

Surrounding Area
 Gobō Public Employment Security Office
Wakayama Labor Bureau Gobō Labor Standards Inspection Office
Wakayama District Court Gobō Branch
Wakayama Family Court Gobō Branch

See also
List of railway stations in Japan

References

External links

 Gobō Station Official Site

Railway stations in Wakayama Prefecture
Railway stations in Japan opened in 1929
Gobō, Wakayama